Christa McAuliffe Middle School may refer to:
 Christa McAuliffe Middle School - Los Alamitos, California - Los Alamitos Unified School District
 Christa McAuliffe Middle School - Boynton Beach, Florida - School District of Palm Beach County
 Christa McAuliffe Middle School - Jackson, New Jersey - Jackson School District
 Christa McAuliffe Middle School - Houston, Texas - Fort Bend Independent School District
 McAuliffe International School and McAuliffe Manual Middle School - Denver, Colorado - Denver Public Schools